680 Genoveva is a minor planet orbiting the Sun. It was named after the play Genoveva by Friedrich Hebbel.
The name may have been inspired by the asteroid's provisional designation 1909 GW, as W is pronounced 'v' in German, as is V in Latinate names such as 'Genoveva'.

References

External links 
 
 

000680
Discoveries by August Kopff
Named minor planets
000680
19090422